Gravenor Bay is a large bay at the southern end of the island of Barbuda in the Caribbean. Its coastline runs roughly east–west and lies between the island's two southernmost points, Coco Point in the west and Spanish Point in the east. An airfield lies close to the western end of the bay, and a large lagoon lies immediately to the bay's north.

The bay is a favoured yacht anchorage and is popular with snorkellers.

References

Miller, D. (ed.) (2005) Caribbean Islands. (4th edition). Footscray, VIC: Lonely Planet.
Scott, C. R. (ed.) (2005) Insight guide: Caribbean (5th edition). London: Apa Publications.

Bays of Antigua and Barbuda
Geography of Barbuda